Donalroe Parish in Cobar Shire is a civil parish of Rankin County,;  a Cadastral division of New South Wales.
The Parish is on the Darling River upstream of Wilcannia, New South Wales,;  a Cadastral division of New South Wales. and is located at 31°11′32″S 144°10′24″E.

Geography
The topography is flat with a Köppen climate classification of BsK (Hot semi arid).

The economy in the parish is based on broad acre agriculture, based on Wheat, sheep and cattle.

The traditional owners of the area are the Barundji and Barkindji people, with the Danggalia people on the opposite bank of the Darling River.

See also
Rankin County, Mississippi

References

Parishes of Rankin County
Central West (New South Wales)
Towns in New South Wales
Localities in New South Wales
Geography of New South Wales
Populated places in New South Wales